Gilbert Morgan (15 April 1908 – 11 August 1973), also known by the nickname of "Gil", was a Welsh rugby union and professional rugby league footballer who played in the 1930s. Gilbert played for Streatham and Mitcham in the early 1930s before moving to Halifax from around 1935 until 1937 then joining Dewsbury in 1938.

Background
Gil Morgan was born and brought up in Llanhilleth, Monmouthshire, and moved to Yorkshire in the mid-1930s. Gil Morgan and his wife settled in Dewsbury, raising their three sons who all currently live in the area. After retiring from rugby, he worked in carpet mills, and he died aged 65 in Dewsbury, West Riding of Yorkshire, England.

International honours
Gil Morgan won a cap for Wales against France while at Dewsbury in 1938.

References

1908 births
1973 deaths
Crawshays RFC players
Dewsbury Rams players
Halifax R.L.F.C. players
Llanhilleth RFC players
Rugby league players from Blaenau Gwent
Rugby league second-rows
Rugby union players from Blaenau Gwent
Streatham and Mitcham R.L.F.C. players
Wales national rugby league team players
Welsh rugby league players
Welsh rugby union players